Himani Bannerji (born 1942) is a Canadian writer, sociologist, scholar, and philosopher from Kolkata, West Bengal, India. She teaches in the Department of Sociology, the Graduate Programme in Social and Political Thought, and the Graduate Programme in Women's Studies at York University in Canada. She is also known for her activist work and poetry. She received her B.A. and M.A. in English from Visva-Bharati University and Jadavpur University respectively, and her M.A. and Ph.D. from the University of Toronto.

Bannerji works in the areas of Marxist, feminist and anti-racist theory. She is especially focused on reading colonial discourse through Karl Marx's concept of ideology, and putting together a reflexive analysis of gender, race and class.
Bannerji also does much lecturing about the Gaze and othering and silencing of women who are marginalized.

Her novella, Coloured Pictures, teaches children about confronting racism.

In addition to her work in the academy, Bannerji has also published in a variety of venues to reach different audiences. Two of her articles have been published in Rungh Magazine.

Early life 
Bannerji was born in Bengal Presidency of British India. She studied in Calcutta and earned a B.A. and M.A.. Her thesis was completed in 1988 with the title: The Politics of Representation: A Study of Class and Class Struggle in the Political Theatre of West Bengal.

Bibliography
The Ideological Condition: Selected Essays on History, Race and Gender. (Brill)
Demography and Democracy: Essays on Nationalism, Gender and Ideology. (Canadian Scholars' Press and Orient Blackswan)
Inventing Subjects: Studies in Hegemony, Patriarchy and Colonialism.  (Tulika)
Dark Side of the Nation: Essays on Multiculturalism, Nationalism and Racism (Canadian Scholars Press)
The Writing on the Wall: Essays on Culture and Politics (TSAR Press);
Thinking Through: Essays in Marxism, Feminism and Anti-Racism (The Women's Press)
The Mirror of Class: Essays on Bengali theatre (Papyrus)

Fiction
 Coloured Pictures (A novel) (Toronto: Sister Vision, 1991)
 Her Mother's Ashes, in: Nurjehan Aziz, ed. Her Mother's Ashes. Stories by South Asian Women in Canada and the United States. TSAR Publications, Toronto 1994

Poetry
Doing Time: Poems (Toronto: Sister Vision, 1986.)
A Separate Sky (Toronto: Domestic Bliss, 1982.) - Which includes her translation of Bengali poems by Subhas Mukhapadhyay, Manbendra Bandyopadhyay and Shamshur Rahman.

Co-authored and edited

Of Property and Propriety: The Role of Gender and Class in Imperialism and Nationalism (University of Toronto Press);
Unsettling Relations: The University as a Site for Feminist Struggle (The Women's Press); 
Returning the Gaze: : Essays on Gender, Race and Class by Non-White Women (SisterVision Press)

References

External links
 'On the Dark Side of the Nation' article
 Rabindra Memorial Prize
 Yorku profile

1942 births
Bengali Hindus
20th-century Bengalis
21st-century Bengalis
Bengali writers
Writers from Kolkata
Women writers from West Bengal
Canadian feminist writers
Canadian non-fiction writers
Canadian people of Bengali descent
Canadian women non-fiction writers
Canadian writers of Asian descent
Canadian Hindus
Jadavpur University alumni
Living people
University of Toronto alumni
Visva-Bharati University alumni
Academic staff of York University
Canadian Marxist writers
Indian emigrants to Canada
Bengali philosophers